Hue is a surname and given name and occasionally a nickname. Notable people with the name include:

Surname:
 Armand Thomas Hue de Miromesnil (1723-1796), French government minister
 André Hue (1923-2005), Anglo-French SOE agent.
 Clement Hue (1778 or 1779–1861), British physician
 Douglas Sang Hue (born 1931), Jamaican cricket umpire
 Georges Hüe (1858-1948), French composer
 Jermaine Hue (born 1978), Jamaican footballer
 José de Carvajal y Hué (1835-1899), Spanish lawyer, economist, writer and politician
 Robert Hue (born 1946), French communist politician
 Steevy Chong Hue (born 1990), Tahitian footballer
 Young Soon Hue (born 1963), South Korean ballet choreographer

Given name:
 Hue de Rotelande, late 12th century Cambro-Norman poet
 Hue de la Ferté (fl. 1220–35), French troubadour
 Hue Hollins (born 1942), former National Basketball Association referee
 Hue Lee (born 1922), Chinese singer
 Hue Montgomery, singer of the Foundations

Nickname:
 Huey Hue Jackson (born 1965), American National Football League head coach

See also
 Nguyễn Huệ (1753-1792), second emperor of the Tây Sơn dynasty of Vietnam
 Heo, sometimes spelled Hue, a Korean family name
 Hue (disambiguation)
 Hues (disambiguation)